The 1953–54 British Ice Hockey season featured the English National League and Scottish National League.

English National League

English Autumn Cup

Results

Scottish National League

Regular season

Playoffs
Semifinals
Paisley Pirates - Perth Panthers 5:2, 5:7, 3:5
Falkirk Lions - Edinburgh Royals 4:3, 6:4
Final
Falkirk Lions - Perth Panthers 10:6, 3:2

Scottish Autumn Cup

Results

Canada Cup

Results

Scottish Cup

Results
First round
10/13/53: Ayr Raiders - Fife Flyers 9:5 
10/19/53: Falkirk Lions - Dundee Tigers 9:8
10/20/53: Perth Panthers - Edinburgh Royals 
Semifinals
Falkirk Lions - Paisley Pirates 13:3 on aggregate (10:2 on 12/9, 3:1 on 12/14)
Perth Panthers - Ayr Raiders 14:6 on aggregate (6:1 on 12/22, 8:5 on 12/28)
Final
Perth Panthers - Falkirk Lions 15:14 on aggregate (9:5 on 2/16, 6:9 on 3/1)

References 

British
1953 in English sport
1954 in English sport
1953–54 in British ice hockey
1953 in Scottish sport
1954 in Scottish sport